Ammonium carbonate is a salt with the chemical formula (NH4)2CO3. Since it readily degrades to gaseous ammonia and carbon dioxide upon heating, it is used as a leavening agent and also as smelling salt. It is also known as baker's ammonia and is a predecessor to the more modern leavening agents baking soda and baking powder. It is a component of what was formerly known as sal volatile and salt of hartshorn, and produces a pungent smell when baked.

Production
Ammonium carbonate is produced by combining carbon dioxide and aqueous ammonia. About 80,000 tons/year were produced as of 1997.

An orthorhombic monohydrate is known. It crystallizes in an ammonia solution exposed in a carbon dioxide-rich atmosphere.

Decomposition
Ammonium carbonate slowly decomposes at standard temperature and pressure through two pathways. Thus any initially pure sample of ammonium carbonate will soon become a mixture including various byproducts.

Ammonium carbonate can spontaneously decompose into ammonium bicarbonate and ammonia:
 (NH4)2CO3 → NH4HCO3 + NH3

Which further decomposes to carbon dioxide, water and another molecule of ammonia:

 NH4HCO3 → H2O + CO2 + NH3

Uses

Leavening agent
Ammonium carbonate may be used as a leavening agent in traditional recipes, particularly those from northern Europe and Scandinavia (e.g. Amerikaner, Speculoos, Tunnbröd or Lebkuchen). It was the precursor to today's more commonly used baking powder.

Originally made from ground deer horn and called hartshorn, today it is called baker's ammonia. It is prepared by the sublimation of a mixture of ammonium sulfate and calcium carbonate and occurs as a white powder or a hard, white or translucent mass. It acts as a heat activated leavening agent and breaks down into carbon dioxide (leavening), ammonia (which needs to dissipate) and water. It is sometimes combined with sodium bicarbonate to mimic as a double acting baking powder and to help mask any ammonia smell not baked out.

It also serves as an acidity regulator and has the E number E503. It can be replaced with baking powder, but this may affect both the taste and texture of the finished product. Baker's ammonia should be used to create thin dry baked goods like crackers and cookies. This allows the strong ammonia smell to bake out. It should not be used to make moist baked items like cake since ammonia is hydrophilic and will leave a strong bitter taste.

Its use as a leavening agent, with associated controversy, goes back centuries:

Other uses
Ammonium carbonate is the main component of smelling salts, although the commercial scale of their production is small. Buckley's cough syrup from Canada today uses ammonium carbonate as an active ingredient intended to help relieve symptoms of bronchitis. It is also used as an emetic. It is also found in smokeless tobacco products, such as Skoal, and it is used in aqueous solution as a photographic lens cleaning agent, such as Eastman Kodak's "Kodak Lens Cleaner."

It is also used for luring of apple maggots in Washington State, to monitor the spread of the infestation and adjust the borders of the Apple Maggot Quarantine Area.

It is also used to reduce the amount of actual cocoa in a product, such as in Oreo cookies.

See also
Ammonium bicarbonate
Ammonium nitrate
Sal ammoniac, the mineralogical form of ammonium chloride

References

Carbonates
Ammonium compounds
Leavening agents